Whisker is a research control system developed within the University of Cambridge, UK, and marketed by Campden Instruments Ltd (UK) and the Lafayette Instrument Company (USA). It is implemented as a server that controls a range of physical devices (including digital switches for input and output devices such as levers and pellet dispensers, multiple monitors, sound cards, and touchscreens). The server communicates with clients via a TCP/IP network link and manages resources for them. Typically, individual clients are programs that implement tasks used in behavioural research (e.g. psychology and neuroscience), such as tasks involving operant chambers.

References 

Laboratory software